Li Bong-sun (born 14 March 1949) is a North Korean wrestler. He competed in the men's freestyle 52 kg at the 1976 Summer Olympics.

References

1949 births
Living people
North Korean male sport wrestlers
Olympic wrestlers of North Korea
Wrestlers at the 1976 Summer Olympics
Place of birth missing (living people)
Wrestlers at the 1974 Asian Games
Asian Games competitors for North Korea
20th-century North Korean people